Mamaloi is a song on the Doobie Brothers' second album, Toulouse Street. It was written by guitarist and vocalist Patrick Simmons and featured Tom Johnston on lead vocals. It’s a unique tune on the record, with Toulouse Street being a rock record and this song being reggae.  Allmusic critic Bruce Eder described Mamaloi as a "laid-back Caribbean idyll."

References

The Doobie Brothers songs
1972 songs
Song recordings produced by Ted Templeman
Songs written by Patrick Simmons